Mian Rud (also Romanized as Mīān Rūd; also known as Mīān Rūd-e ‘Olyā and Varmazyār) is a village in Direh Rural District, in the Central District of Gilan-e Gharb County, Kermanshah Province, Iran. At the 2006 census, its population was 145, in 25 families.

References 

Populated places in Gilan-e Gharb County